William "Bill" Edgar Mather-Brown (born 14 April 1936) is an Australian Paralympian.

Personal
He was born in the Western Australian city of Fremantle in 1936. He contracted polio in 1938 aged 2 in the town of Agnew in the Goldfields, Northeast of Kalgoorlie. He spent 2 years in the Kalgoorlie Hospital before moving back to Perth. He married Nadine Vine on 6 January 1967, who attended the 1972 Heidelberg Games as a team nurse. They had two children.

Paralympic Games

He has always been interested in sport and joined wheelchair sports in 1955. He went to the Stoke Mandeville games in 1957 and competed in several sports. At the 1960 Rome Paralympics, he won a silver medal in Men's Class B table tennis with Bruno Moretti and participated in the Australia men's national wheelchair basketball team. At the 1964 Tokyo Paralympics, he participated in wheelchair fencing as part of the Men's Épée Team. At the 1968 Tel Aviv Paralympics, he won a silver medal in the Men's Slalom A event and participated in swimming, table tennis and wheelchair basketball events.

Commonwealth Paraplegic Games
Mather-Brown competed at the 1962 Commonwealth Paraplegic Games in his home town of Perth. He won medals in four sports. In weightlifting he wonnthe gold medal in the men's lightweight class B, in wheelchair basketball he won Gold in the Men's competition, in table tennis he won a gold medal in the men's doubles Class B and a silver medal in the men's class B, in swimming he won gold in the men's backstroke 50 metres Class C, and silver in the men's 50 metres crawl, class C.

Recognition
 Inducted into Wheelchair Sports WA Hall of Fame.
 Life Membership of Wheelchair Sports WA - 1981
 Western Australian Citizen of the Year for Sport - 1981
 Australian Wheelchair Basketball Hall of Fame - 1995
 Australian Sports Medal - 2000 as a "basketball Paralympian - Captain/Coach since 1957". 
 Centenary Medal - 2001 "for service to the community through disabled and wheelchair sports".

Notes

References

External links
Picture of Bill Mather-Brown, Perth Sports Day, 1967 
Mather-Brown interviewed by Robin Poke in the Australian Centre for Paralympic Studies oral history project, 2010

Paralympic athletes of Australia
Male Paralympic swimmers of Australia
Paralympic table tennis players of Australia
Paralympic wheelchair basketball players of Australia
Paralympic wheelchair fencers of Australia
Table tennis players at the 1960 Summer Paralympics
Wheelchair basketball players at the 1960 Summer Paralympics
Wheelchair fencers at the 1964 Summer Paralympics
Athletes (track and field) at the 1968 Summer Paralympics
Swimmers at the 1968 Summer Paralympics
Table tennis players at the 1968 Summer Paralympics
Wheelchair basketball players at the 1968 Summer Paralympics
Medalists at the 1960 Summer Paralympics
Medalists at the 1968 Summer Paralympics
Paralympic silver medalists for Australia
Wheelchair category Paralympic competitors
Athletes from Perth, Western Australia
People with polio
Recipients of the Australian Sports Medal
Recipients of the Centenary Medal
1936 births
Living people
Australian male fencers
Paralympic medalists in athletics (track and field)
Australian male swimmers
Australian male wheelchair racers
20th-century Australian people